Taurometopa phoenicozona is a moth in the family Crambidae. It was described by George Hampson in 1917. It is found in Australia, where it has been recorded from Queensland.

The wingspan is about 16 mm. The forewings are golden yellow with deep red bands suffused with silver. The hindwings are semihyaline yellow, the terminal area suffused with brown.

References

Moths described in 1917
Odontiinae